Samuel Pickworth Woodward (17 September 1821 – 11 July 1865) was an English geologist and malacologist.

Biography

He was the son of the geologist Samuel Woodward.

In 1845, S. P. Woodward became the professor of geology and natural history in the Royal Agricultural College, Cirencester.

In 1848 he was appointed assistant in the department of geology and mineralogy in the British Museum.

He was author of A Manual of the Mollusca (in three parts, 1851, 1853 and 1856).

He proposed the term Bernician Series for the lower portion of the Carboniferous System, below the Millstone Grit.

He died on the 11th July 1865 and was buried on the eastern side of Highgate Cemetery.

Woodwardite, a hexagonal mineral containing aluminum, copper, hydrogen, oxygen, and sulphur, was described as a new mineral species by Church (1866) and named in honour Samuel Pickworth Woodward; its (type locality was given only as Cornwall.

Family
S. P. Woodward's son, Horace Bolingbroke Woodward (1848-1914), became in 1863 an assistant in the library of the Geological Society, and joined the Geological Survey in 1867, rising to be assistant-director. In 1893-1894 he was president of the Geologists' Association, and he published many important works on geology. A younger son was Bernard Barham Woodward, a British malacologist and a member of staff at the British Museum and the Natural History Museum.

Bibliography
 A Manual of the Mollusca (in three parts, 1851, 1853 and 1856).
  Fischer P., Oehlert P. & Woodward S. P. (1885-1887). Manuel de conchyliologie et de paléontologie conchyliologique ou histoire naturelle des mollusques vivants et fossiles suivi d'un appendice sur les brachipodes. Avec 23 planches contenant 600 figures et 1138 gravures dans le texte. pp. I-XXIV, pp. 1–1369, Plates I-XXIII, 1 map. Paris.

References

External links

1821 births
1865 deaths
Burials at Highgate Cemetery
19th-century British geologists
Academics of the Royal Agricultural University
Employees of the Natural History Museum, London